Selaginella bifida is a lycophyte native to Rodrigues Island in the Mascarene Islands. It was found firstly in 1991 on the Mont Limon at 20–150 m high and was confused with S. rodrigueziana Baker because of their strong phenotypical homologies. However, fastidious studies in 2009 highlight ciliate lateral leaf margins on several specimens and bifid microsporophyll apices during the emergence of reproductive parts, which differentiate a new taxon.

References 
 Delmail D. (2009) - Selaginella bifida sp. nov. (Selaginellaceae: Pteridophyta) from Rodrigues Island, Mauritius. Nordic Journal of Botany, 27: 178–181. 
 IPNI

External links

bifida
Endemic flora of Rodrigues
Plants described in 2009